William James O' Shea (6 October 1856 – 5 November 1918) was a Scottish-born actor. He was born in Dumfries, Scotland and was brought to the United States when he was one-year old. His father, Thomas Shea, was a civil engineer  who fought with David Farragut in the Battle of New Orleans during the American Civil War.

Shea got his start acting at the age of 18 in Col. John W. Albaugh's stock company in Albany, New York. During the 1880s, he also became known as an Irish dancer and singer. He was said to be the first real actor Vitagraph ever hired, having appeared over 4,000 roles  in more than one hundred films from 1905 to 1918.

Shea died of heart disease at his home on November 5, 1918. Obituaries at the time listed Shea as the oldest movie actor in the United States, although most list his age at time of death as 56 years old. Shea is buried in Holy Cross Cemetery, Brooklyn.

Selected filmography

References

External links

1856 births
1918 deaths
People from Dumfries
20th-century British male actors
Scottish male film actors
Scottish male silent film actors
Scottish emigrants to the United States
British expatriate male actors in the United States